Baicha or bai cha may refer to:
White tea, several styles of tea using young or minimally-processed tea leaves
Anji bai cha, grean tea variety produced in Anji, Zhejiang, China
Baicha, Jiangxi, town in Yongxiu County, Jiujiang, Jiangxi, China
Bai cha, a Khmer variation of fried rice